The Arab Gulf States Institute is a Washington, D.C.-based think tank dedicated to covering the "social, economic, and political diversity of the Arab countries in the Persian Gulf region." Ambassador Frank G. Wisner is Chairman of the Board of the Institute.

Publications

Several contributors produce long and short-term strategic papers on issues concerning the Gulf states, and their relationship with the United States and each other. Moreover, the Institute publishes a weekly newsletter called The Dhow that contains research, analysis, and commentary.

References

External links
 

Nonpartisan organizations in the United States
Political and economic think tanks in the United States
Think tanks based in Washington, D.C.
Foreign policy and strategy think tanks in the United States
Charities based in Washington, D.C.
Think tanks established in 2014
2014 establishments in the United States
Middle Eastern-American culture in Washington, D.C.
Middle Eastern studies in the United States
Arab–American relations